W. Ray Johnston (January 2, 1892 – October 14, 1966) was an American film producer. He was associated with low-budget filmmaking, in particular with the larger Poverty Row studios Rayart Pictures and Monogram Pictures. Before founding Rayart in 1924, he also acted in a handful of films.

Selected filmography

 Midnight Secrets (1924)
 For Another Woman (1924)
 Lightning Romance (1924)
 Geared to Go (1924)
 Trail Dust (1924)
 Easy Money (1925)
 The Knockout Kid (1925)
 Youth's Gamble (1925)
Fighting Fate  (1925)
 The Pride of the Force (1925)
 Winning a Woman (1925)
 Racing Romance (1926)
 The Wolf Hunters (1926)
 The Last Alarm (1926)
 The Dangerous Dude (1926)
 The Self Starter (1926)
 Stick to Your Story (1926)
 Speed Crazed (1926)
 Somebody's Mother (1926)
 The Winner (1926)
 Kentucky Handicap (1926)
 The Gallant Fool (1926)
 The Racing Fool (1927)
 The Range Riders (1927)
 The Show Girl (1927)
The Silent Hero  (1927) 
 Modern Daughters (1927)
 Heroes in Blue (1927)
 Thunderbolt's Tracks (1927)
 On the Stroke of Twelve (1927)
 The Law and the Man (1928)
 Sisters of Eve (1928)
 The Phantom of the Turf (1928)
 Should a Girl Marry? (1928)
 Isle of Lost Men (1928)
 The City of Purple Dreams (1928)
 Shanghai Rose (1929)
 Handcuffed (1929)
 The Cowboy and the Outlaw (1929)
 Overland Bound (1929)
 All Faces West (1929)
 Western Honor (1930)
 Beyond the Law (1930)
 The Phantom of the Desert (1930)
 Westward Bound (1930)
 Defenders of the Law (1931)
 Rider of the Plains (1931)
A Son of the Plains (1931)
 Hidden Valley (1932)
 The Arm of the Law (1932)
 Ghost City (1932)
 Million Dollar Baby (1934)
 Women Must Dress (1935)

References

Bibliography
 Michael R. Pitts. Poverty Row Studios, 1929–1940: An Illustrated History of 55 Independent Film Companies, with a Filmography for Each. McFarland & Company, 2005.

External links

1892 births
1966 deaths
American film producers
American film production company founders
Businesspeople from Iowa
20th-century American businesspeople